The Nedbank Affinity Cup was a golf tournament on the Sunshine Tour. It was founded in 2007 as a precursor to the Nedbank Golf Challenge, and is played at the Gary Player designed Lost City Golf Course, in Sun City, North West, South Africa.

Winners

References

External links
Sunshine Tour - official site

Former Sunshine Tour events
Golf tournaments in South Africa
Recurring sporting events established in 2007
Recurring sporting events disestablished in 2015
2007 establishments in South Africa